The Cardiovascular and Interventional Radiological Society of Europe is a learned society of interventional radiologists from Europe and overseas. The society has its headquarters in Vienna (Austria) and was founded in 1985 by the merging of the European College of Angiography and European Society of Cardio-Vascular Radiology and Interventional Radiology. It currently has approximately 4,200 members from around the world, including 24 national societies. CIRSE's objective is to provide continuing education to physicians and scientists with an active interest in interventional radiology and to promote research as well as registries.

CIRSE organises an annual congress with more than 5,000 participants, scientific meetings such as the European Conference on Embolotherapy and the European Conference on Interventional Oncology, as well as educational activities such as courses focusing on specific procedures. It publishes a bimonthly medical journal entitled CardioVascular and Interventional Radiology as well as other publications such as newsletters and manuals.

CIRSE Foundation
CIRSE's educational arm, the CIRSE Foundation, is an independent non-profit foundation, promoting research and education in the fields of cardiovascular and interventional radiology. The foundation funds several educational grants every year.

References

External links
 
 CIRSE Foundation

International medical associations of Europe
Medical imaging organizations
Organizations established in 1985
1985 establishments in Austria